Pierre-Albert 'Gabet' Chapuisat (born 5 April 1948) is a Swiss retired football defender and manager.

Playing career
During his extensive professional career, Lausanne-born Chapuisat played mainly for hometown's FC Lausanne-Sport, having three different spells with the club. In the 1972–73 season he had his first and single abroad experience, representing Paris FC of France, then of Ligue 1.

Chapuisat finished his Lausanne career at 36, then moved to lowly Vevey Sports (helping the side retain its Super League status during his two-year spell), and retired after one season with FC Renens. He was capped 34 times by the Swiss national team, the first game being on 14 May 1969 in a 0–1 home loss against Romania for the 1970 FIFA World Cup qualifiers, in Lausanne.

Coaching career
A manager immediately after his 1987 retirement (starting with his main club's youth teams), Chapuisat coached mainly in the lower leagues of his country. In the 2006–07 campaign, however, he helped FC Sion to the third place in the top division.

Personal life
Chapuisat's son, Stéphane, was also a professional footballer. A forward, he also represented Lausanne, but played mainly in Germany for Borussia Dortmund, appearing 103 times for Switzerland.

References

External links

1948 births
Living people
Swiss-French people
Sportspeople from Lausanne
Swiss men's footballers
Association football defenders
Swiss Super League players
FC Lausanne-Sport players
FC Zürich players
Ligue 1 players
Paris FC players
Switzerland international footballers
Swiss expatriate footballers
Expatriate footballers in France
Swiss football managers
FC Locarno managers
FC Winterthur managers
Étoile Carouge FC managers
Yverdon-Sport FC managers
FC Sion managers